

Events
January - Shekhar Sen receives a Padma Shri Award in the field of the Arts from the Indian Government.

Albums
Vijay Iyer Trio - Break Stuff

Classical

Deaths
4 January - Chitresh Das, Kathak dance instructor and choreographer, 70
28 January - Mala Aravindan, actor and singer, 76
20 March - Shahir Krishnarao Sable, Marathi folk singer-songwriter, 92

See also 
 2015 in music
 List of albums released in 2015

References 

India
Indian music
Music